Dreams of Reason Produce Monsters is the second solo studio album by Mick Karn, released in February 1987. It peaked at number 89 on the UK Albums Chart.

Release and reception
After the release of his debut solo album Titles, Karn wanted to prove that he was a composer and more than just a bass player. Therefore, on Dreams of Reason Produce Monsters, there isn't much bass guitar. However, he later thought there should have been more bass on the album and described it as the weakest album he made.

The album features two of his former Japan bandmates, David Sylvian and Steve Jansen. Sylvian provides vocals on "Buoy" and "When Love Walks In", which were two of the three songs that feature vocals on the album (with the other being "Answer" which features a choir and ensemble). Sylvian also co-wrote these two songs and also provided additional keyboards on "Land". Jansen co-produced the album with Karn as well as playing it as writing "Land".

"Buoy" was released as a single in January 1987. It featured "Dreams of Reason" as the B-side and "Language of Ritual" as the second 12-inch single B-side. The single peaked at number 63 on the UK Singles Chart.

Reviewing for New Musical Express, Len Brown was "far from satisfied" with the album, describing it as "by and large an instrumental work; a neo-classical affair; a movie soundtrack in need of images or at least explanations", with several songs "really [amounting] to unaffecting, repetitive ramblings, lacking focus or real direction". However, he did describe "Buoy" as "one clear moment of beauty" that "towers above everything else" on the album. Carole Linfield for Music Week wrote that the album "does touch briefly on the esoteric beauty of Karn's former group Japan", but that the album "though both acceptable and professional, remains firmly planted in the ambient section. Which is no mean feat, but it's failing is really in the fact that the best track by far is the single".

Track listing

Personnel
Musicians
 Mick Karn – bass, keyboards, soprano saxophone, alto saxophone, tenor saxophone, clarinet, bass clarinet, accordion, dida, drums, percussion, flute, backing vocals
 Steve Jansen – keyboards, drums, percussion, backing vocals
 David Sylvian – vocals (3, 6), additional keyboards (4)
 Eric Willian – E-flat trumpet (1), French horn (5)
 Paul Jones – harmonica
 Bury Church School Choir – choir (8)
 Keith Williams Music Ensemble – ensemble (8)

Technical
 Femi Jiya – engineer, mixing
 Mick Karn – mixing, arrangement, producer, inner sleeve artwork
 Steve Jansen – mixing, arrangement, producer
 Andy Mason – assistant mixing
 David Grow – design
 Richard Haughton – cover photo
 Delicia Burnell – album coordinator

Charts

References

1987 albums
Virgin Records albums